The Șercaia is a left tributary of the river Olt in Romania. It discharges into the Olt in Hălmeag. The upper reach of the river, upstream of the confluence with the Holbav is also known as Valea Poiana Mărului. The middle reach of the river, from the junction with the Holbav to the confluence with the Scurta (downstream of the village of Vad) is also known as the Șinca.

Tributaries

The following rivers are tributaries to the river Șercaia (from source to mouth):

Left: Strâmba, Plopoasa, Crețu, Șercăița, Scurta, Băluș
Right: Valea sub Masa Mare, Holbav, Ruda Mică, Ruda Mare, Trestioara

References

Rivers of Romania
Rivers of Brașov County